27th (Home Counties) Anti-Aircraft Brigade (27 AA Bde) was an Air Defence formation of the British Army in the Second World War that served in The Blitz and later converted to infantry.

Origin

German air raids by Zeppelin airships and Gotha bombers on London and other British cities during the First World War had shown the need for strong anti-aircraft (AA) defences in any future war. When the Territorial Army (TA) was reformed in 1922 it included a number of dedicated AA units of the Royal Artillery (RA) and Royal Engineers (RE). Two formations were organised in London District to command these units, provisionally known as the 2nd and 3rd London Air Defence Brigades, but soon numbered 26th and 27th.

Both brigades were based at the Duke of York's Headquarters in Chelsea. 3rd AD Bde's units were initially based at Lytton Grove, Putney, taking over buildings previously used by the City of London Yeomanry (Rough Riders).

The 27th (London) Air Defence Brigade comprised:
 53rd (City of London) Anti-Aircraft Brigade, RA (TA) (HAA unit formed in 1922 at Putney, recruited mainly from men in banks and insurance companies in the City of London)
 HQ at White City, London
 157th (City of London) AA Battery at White City
 158th (City of London) AA Battery at White City
 159th (Lloyd's) (City of London) AA Battery at White City
 54th (City of London) Anti-Aircraft Brigade, RA (TA) (HAA unit formed in 1922 at Putney)
 HQ at Putney
 160th (City of London) AA Battery at Putney
 161st (City of London) AA Battery at Putney
 162nd (City of London) AA Battery at Putney
 27th (London) Anti-Aircraft Battalion (London Electrical Engineers), RE (TA) (a searchlight unit)
 HQ at Streatham
 304th AA Company at Westminster
 305th AA Company at Westminster
 306th AA Company at Westminster
 390th AA Company at Westminster
 27th (London) Anti-Aircraft Signal Company, Royal Signals

1935 Reorganisation
As Britain's AA defences expanded during the 1930s, higher formations became necessary. 1st AA Division was formed at the end of 1935 to cover London and the Home Counties. As part of this reorganisation, 26th (London) Bde assumed command of all the gun and searchlight units of the two former brigades, while the 27th was reformed as 27th (Home Counties) Anti-Aircraft Group, based at RAF Kenley, to command new AA units in the South London suburbs.
 60th (City of London) Anti-Aircraft Brigade, RA, (TA) (heavy anti-aircraft (HAA) gun unit formed in 1935 by conversion of 4th (City of London) Battalion, London Regiment)
 HQ at Catford
 168 Battery at Catford
 169 Battery at Catford
 194 Battery at Catford
 30th (Surrey) Anti-Aircraft Battalion, RE, (TA)  (formed in 1935 from HQ Surrey Group AA Searchlight Companies RE)
 HQ at Kingston upon Thames
 315 Company at Croydon
 316 Company at Kingston upon Thames
 318 Company at Guildford
 323 Company at Ewell
 31st (City of London Rifles) Anti-Aircraft Battalion, RE (TA) (searchlight unit formed in 1935 by conversion of 6th Battalion, the London Regiment (City of London Rifles))
 HQ at Sutton
 324 Company at Sutton
 325 Company at Sutton
 326 Company at Merton
 327 Company at Hackbridge
 34th (The Queen's Own Royal West Kent) Anti-Aircraft Battalion, RE (TA) (searchlight unit formed in 1935 by conversion of 20th London Regiment (Blackheath & Woolwich), affiliated to the Queen's Own Royal West Kent Regiment)
 HQ at Blackheath
 320 Company at Greenwich
 336 Company at Blackheath
 337 Company at Blackheath
 338 Company at Eltham
 35th (First Surrey Rifles) Anti-Aircraft Battalion, RE (TA) (searchlight unit formed in 1935 by conversion of 21st Battalion, London Regiment, affiliated to the East Surrey Regiment)
 HQ at Camberwell
 340th Company at Camberwell
 341st Company at Camberwell
 342nd Company at Camberwell
 343rd Company at Camberwell

The AA Groups took the more usual formation title of Brigades on 1 January 1939 after the Royal Artillery replaced its traditional unit designation 'Brigade' by the modern 'Regiment'.

Outbreak of war
During the period of tension leading to the Munich crisis and eventually the outbreak of the Second World War, the Territorial Army grew enormously, and existing TA infantry battalions continued to be converted to AA regiments. The number of divisions and brigades was expanded, and the whole AA defence of the United Kingdom was taken over by Anti-Aircraft Command on 1 April 1939. When the UK declared war on 3 September 1939, 27th (Home Counties) AA Bde was a searchlight formation in 6 AA Division (also based at Uxbridge) and had the following composition:

 Brigade HQ: Lingfield, Surrey
 31st (City of London Rifles) Anti-Aircraft Battalion, RE (TA)
 HQ, 324, 325, 326, 327 Companies as before
 34th (The Queen's Own Royal West Kent) Anti-Aircraft Battalion, RE (TA)
 HQ, 302, 336, 337, 338 Companies as before
 70th (Sussex) Searchlight Regiment, Royal Artillery (a newly formed TA Unit)
 HQ, 459, 460, 461 Batteries all at Brighton

In August 1940, during the Battle of Britain, the RE 'Anti-Aircraft' (searchlight) battalions became regiments of the RA.

The Blitz
By late 1940, at the height of The Blitz, 27 AA Bde was serving in 5 AA Division covering the important naval base of Portsmouth, with the following regiments under command:

 31st (City of London Rifles) Searchlight Regiment, RA (TA)
 70th (Sussex) Searchlight Regiment, RA (TA)
 
The AA Corps and Divisions were disbanded and replaced on 1 October 1942 by new AA Groups. Late in 1944, 27 AA Bde was serving in 2 AA Group, covering the Solent, South-East England and southern East Anglia.

Mid-war
Over the two years following the end of the Blitz, the brigade had the following changes in composition:
 31st S/L Rgt (converted into 123rd Light Anti-Aircraft (LAA) Rgt February 1942; left August 1942)
 324, 325, 326, 327 S/L Btys (converted into 405, 408, 409 LAA Btys) 
 34th S/L Rgt
 302, 336, 337, 338 Btys
 23rd LAA Rgt (attached to 65 AA Bde; joined May, left June 1941)
 73, 74, 130, 229 Btys
 43rd LAA Rgt (joined and left June 1941)
 147, 148, 198 Btys
 35th S/L Rgt (rejoined Summer 1941, left December 1941)
 340, 341, 342, 343 Btys
 124th HAA Rgt (joined Autumn 1941, left October-November 1942)
 219, 410, 412, 415 Btys
 1st S/L Rgt (Regular regiment, joined January 1942)
 1, 2, 7 Btys
 8 Bty (attached to 71 AA Bde October–November 1942)
 132nd LAA Rgt (converted from 85th S/L Rgt March 1942, joined by May 1942, left June 1942)
 436, 437, 438, 441 Btys
 107th HAA Rgt (joined and left June 1942)
 334, 335, 337, 390 Btys
 68th LAA Rgt (joined August 1942, left October-November 1942)
 203, 278 Btys
 204 Bty (attached to 47 AA Bde)
 98th LAA Rgt(joined August 1942)
 304 Bty (attached to 47 AA Bde)
 305, 306, 481 Btys
 146th HAA Rgt (joined September 1942; left November 1942)
 176, 359, 414, 465 Btys
 179th (Mixed) HAA Rgt (new regiment joined October-November 1942; left November 1942)
 564 Bty (attached to 47 AA Bde)
 584, 606 Btys
 4th (Ulster) LAA Rgt (converted from 3rd (Ulster) S/L Rgt; joined October-November 1942; left November 1942) 
 7, 8, 10 Bty
 112th (Durham Light Infantry) LAA Rgt (converted from 47th (DLI) S/L Rgt; joined October-November 1942; left November 1942)
 364, 365, 366 Btys
 125th (Cameronian) LAA Rgt (converted from 56th (Cameronian) S/L Rgt; joined December 1942)
 417, 418, 419 Btys

Increasingly, HAA and support units were 'Mixed', indicating that the operational personnel included women of the Auxiliary Territorial Service (ATS).

Hit and run
The AA defences of Southern England were severely tested in the summer of 1942 by the Luftwaffes 'hit-and-run' attacks along the South Coast, and there was much reorganisation, accounting for some of the turnover of units listed earlier. In August 1942, 27 AA Bde was transferred from 5th AA Division to 3rd AA Division, a HQ brought down from Scotland to handle the increased workload.Routledge, pp. 402–4. However, all the AA Divisions were disbanded on 30 September. 27 AA Brigade joined the new 2 AA Group covering South East England, and took responsibility for S/L units in that area. After this major reorganisation in October–December 1942, the brigade settled down with the following composition:
 125th LAA Rgt
 417, 418, 419 Btys
 1st S/L Rgt
 1, 2, 7 Btys
 8 Bty (attached to 71 AA Bde)
 34th S/L Rgt
 302, 337, 338 Btys
 336 Bty (attached to 47 AA Bde)

However, in the spring of 1943, 125th LAA left 27 AA Bde, later joining 76 AA Bde, one of the formations earmarked for the planned invasion of Normandy (Operation Overlord). It was briefly replaced in 27 AA Bde by the return of 4th LAA Rgt, but that unit left permanently in May. After that, 27 AA Bde once again became purely a S/L formation.76 AA Bde War Diary, 1943, TNA file WO 166/11247.

In February, the brigade was strengthened to deal with renewed  'hit-and-run' attacks by Luftwaffe fighter-bombers attacking coastal towns at low level in daylight. 73rd (Kent Fortress) S/L Rgt joined from 56 AA Bde, where it had been  covering airfields in Kent, and 355 S/L Bty was detached from 39th (Lancashire Fusiliers) S/L Rgt in 53 AA Bde in North West England, and travelled by train to join 27 AA Bde on the South Coast.
 
Because of the hit-and-run raids, the allocation of Lewis guns for local defence was increased from one to four and later six per S/L site. The guns had to be manned throughout the hours of daylight. On 11 March a raid on Hastings by Focke-Wulf Fw 190s and Messerschmitt Bf 109s flew right over 355's Battery HQ, and a raid by Bf 109s on Ashford on 24 March was engaged by one of 355's sites. However, in May 1943, 355 S/L battery was disbanded, the ATS personnel and specialists being posted to other units in 27 AA Bde, the remainder being drafted as reinforcements to LAA units. 

In April, 73rd S/L Rgt was exchanged for 33rd (St Pancras) S/L Rgt from 66 AA Bde in East Anglia, which took over four areas of Kent under Biggin Hill Sector of No. 11 Group RAF. This area was under regular attack by Luftwaffe fighter-bombers, and the defensive armament of S/L positions was increased, with the existing Lewis guns being supplemented with twin Vickers K machine gun mountings and later twin  0.5-inch Browning machine guns on power mountings.
 

By the summer of 1943 the brigade had the following composition:
 1st S/L Rgt
 1, 2, 7, 8 Btys
 33rd S/L Rgt
 332, 333, 334, 543 Btys
 34th S/L Rgt
 302, 336, 337, 338 Btys
 83rd S/L Rgt joined between 1 Aug and 7 Sep
 365, 513, 514, 515 Btys

From September 1943, 33rd S/L Rgt carried out experiments for AA Command on new combinations of S/Ls and searchlight control radar (SLC). 

Baby Blitz and Operation Diver
By the end of January 1944, 27 AA Bde had been reinforced by further S/L regiments: 
 36th (Middlesex) S/L Rgt
 317, 345, 346, 424 Btys
 38th (The Kings Regiment) S/L Rgt
 350, 351, 352, 353 Btys
 61st (South Lancashire Regiment) S/L Rgt
 432, 433, 434 Btys

Between 21 January and 14 March 1944 the Luftwaffe carried out 11 night raids on London in the so-called 'Baby Blitz'. However, by March 1944, AA Command was being forced to release manpower for Operation Overlord. Each of 27 AA Bde's S/L regiments lost one of its four batteries, leaving:Routledge, p. 409.
 1st S/L Rgt
 1, 2, 7 Btys
 33rd S/L Rgt
 332, 333 334 Btys
 34th S/L Rgt
 302, 336, 337 Btys
 36th  S/L Rgt
 317, 345, 346 Btys
 38th S/L Rgt
 350, 351, 352 Btys
 61st S/L Rgt
 432, 433, 434 Btys
 79th S/L Rgt
 502, 503, 504 Btys
 83rd S/L Rgt
 365, 513, 514 Btys

In May and June 1944, while the build-up for Overlord was at its height, 38th and 61st S/L Rgts were transferred to 38 AA Bde in 2 AA Group (covering the Thames Estuary), but they returned a month later.

In July 1944 came the start of the V-1 flying bomb campaign against London, though Kent was on the fringe of the V-1's route. 27 AA Bde's S/L layout was little affected by the massive reorganisation that AA Command had to carry out to meet this threat (Operation Diver). However, as 21st Army Group overran the V-1 launching sites, the Luftwaffe began to launch them from aircraft over the North Sea. AA Command shifted units from Kent to deal with them, and in November 33rd S/L Rgt had to take over some of the vacated sites along the East Kent coast. 
 By mid-October, 79th and 83rd S/L Rgts had been transferred to 56 AA Bde in 2 AA Group, and both regiments were disbanded shortly afterwards.

By October 1944, the brigade's HQ establishment was 9 officers, 8 male other ranks and 23 members of the ATS, together with a small number of attached drivers, cooks and mess orderlies (male and female). In addition, the brigade had a Mixed Signal Office Section of 1 officer, 5 male other ranks and 19 ATS, which was formally part of the Group signal unit.

Conversion
By the end of 1944, 21st Army Group was suffering a severe manpower shortage, particularly among the infantry.  At the same time the Luftwaffe was suffering from such shortages of pilots, aircraft and fuel that serious aerial attacks on the United Kingdom could be discounted. In January 1945 the War Office began to reorganise surplus anti-aircraft and coastal artillery regiments in the UK into infantry battalions, primarily for line of communication and occupation duties in North West Europe, thereby releasing trained infantry for frontline service.Infantry Rgts at RA 39–45

61st S/L Regiment had already left the brigade in December and been converted into a Garrison regiment, while in mid-Jan 45, 1st S/L had joined 21st Army Group to defend Antwerp and the Scheldt Estuary.

On 22 January 1945, HQ 27 AA Bde under Brigadier H.G. Smith was converted into 303rd Infantry Brigade with the following units under command:Orbat.com
 33rd S/L Rgt became 632nd (St Pancras) Infantry Regiment, Royal Artillery 19th Londons at Regiments.org632 Rgt at RA 39–45
 36th S/L Rgt became 634th (Middlesex) Infantry Regiment, Royal Artillery634 Rgt at RA 39–45
 38thS/L Rgt became 635th (King's Regiment) Infantry Regiment, RA38 S/L at RA 39–45 

After initial infantry training, 303 Bde was sent to Norway in June 1945 as part of the liberation of that country (Operation Doomsday).

Postwar
When the TA was reformed on 1 January 1947, 27 AA Bde was reformed at Dover under the new designation of 53 (Home Counties) AA Brigade''', with the following composition:AA Bdes 30–60 at British Army units 1945 on
 259 (Home Counties) (Cinque Ports) HAA Regt
 489 (Cinque Ports) HAA Regt
 516 LAA Regt

However, the brigade was disbanded in September 1948.

Notes

References
 Titles and Designations of Formations and Units of the Territorial Army, London: War Office, 7 November 1927; artillery units reprinted in Litchfield Appendix IV.
 Major L. F. Ellis, History of the Second World War: United Kingdom Military Series: Victory in the West, Volume II: The Defeat of Germany, London: HM Stationery Office, 1968/Uckfield: Naval & Military, 2004, .
 Gen. Sir Martin Farndale, History of the Royal Regiment of Artillery: The Years of Defeat: Europe and North Africa, 1939–1941, Woolwich: Royal Artillery Institution, 1988/London: Brasseys, 1996, .
 J.B.M. Frederick, Lineage Book of British Land Forces 1660–1978, Vol II, Wakefield, Microform Academic, 1984, .
 
 Norman E.H. Litchfield, The Territorial Artillery 1908–1988 (Their Lineage, Uniforms and Badges), Nottingham: Sherwood Press, 1992.
 Brig N. W. Routledge, History of the Royal Regiment of Artillery: Anti-Aircraft Artillery 1914–55, London: Royal Artillery Institution/Brassey's, 1994, .
 Col J.D. Sainsbury, The Hertfordshire Yeomanry Regiments, Royal Artillery, Part 2: The Heavy Anti-Aircraft Regiment 1938–1945 and the Searchlight Battery 1937–1945; Part 3: The Post-war Units 1947–2002, Welwyn: Hertfordshire Yeomanry and Artillery Trust/Hart Books, 2003, .

External sources
 British Military History
 British Army units from 1945 on
 Imperial War Museum
 Land Forces of Britain, the Empire, and Commonwealth
 Sir Frederick Pile, "The Anti-Aircraft Defence Of The United Kingdom From 28th July, 1939, to 15th April, 1945" London Gazette'' 16 October 1947.
 Orders of Battle
 Patriot Files
 Land Forces of Britain, the Empire and Commonwealth (Regiments.org) (archive site)
 Royal Artillery 1939–1945

Military units and formations established in 1935
Air defence brigades of the British Army
Anti-Aircraft brigades of the British Army in World War II
Military units and formations disestablished in 1948